"Is That All There Is?", a song written by American songwriting team Jerry Leiber and Mike Stoller during the 1960s, became a hit for American singer Peggy Lee and an award winner from her album of the same title in November 1969. The song was originally performed by Georgia Brown in May 1967 for a television special. It was first recorded by disc jockey Dan Daniel in March 1968, but this was an unauthorized recording that, while played on Daniel's own radio show, went unissued at the songwriters' request. The first authorized recording was by Leslie Uggams in August 1968. Then came the hit Peggy Lee version in August 1969, followed by Guy Lombardo in 1969 and Tony Bennett on 22 December 1969.

Peggy Lee's version reached number 11 on the U.S. pop singles chart — becoming her first Top 40 pop hit since "Fever" eleven years earlier—and doing even better on the adult contemporary scene, topping that Billboard chart. It also reached number six in Canada. It won Lee the Grammy Award for Best Female Pop Vocal Performance, and then later was named to the Grammy Hall of Fame.

The orchestral arrangement on the song was composed by Randy Newman, who also played the piano in the slower introduction section, and who also conducted the orchestra.

Lyrics
The lyrics of this song are written from the point of view of a person who is disillusioned with events in life that are supposedly unique experiences. The singer tells of witnessing her family's house on fire when she was a little girl, seeing the circus, and falling in love for the first time. After each recital, she expresses her disappointment in the experience. She suggests that we "break out the booze and have a ball—if that's all there is," instead of worrying about life. She explains that she'll never kill herself either because she knows that death will be a disappointment as well. The verses of the song are spoken, rather than sung. Only the refrain of the song is sung.

Inspiration
The song was inspired by the 1896 story "Disillusionment" by Thomas Mann. Jerry Leiber's wife Gaby Rodgers (née Gabrielle Rosenberg) was born in Germany and lived in the Netherlands. She escaped ahead of the Nazis, settling in Hollywood where she had a brief film career. Rodgers introduced Leiber to the works of Thomas Mann. The lines "Is that all there is to a fire?/Is that all there is/is that all there is?" and three of the events in the song (the fire, failed love, imagined death) are based on the narrator's words in Mann's story; the central idea of both the short story and the song are the same.

In most arrangements of the song, most notably in Peggy Lee's version, the music recalls the style of Kurt Weill, typified by songs such as "Alabama Song" and "Surabaya Johnny".

Chart history

Weekly charts

Year-end charts

Cover versions
This song has been covered by Chaka Khan, Giant Sand, Sandra Bernhard, John Parish and PJ Harvey, Alan Price, The Bobs, Firewater, The New Standards, The Tiger Lillies, Amanda Lear, Joan Morris, James Last and Camille O'Sullivan amongst others. In 1971 Ornella Vanoni recorded an Italian version (text written by Bruno Lauzi) with the title literally translated as "E poi tutto qui ?"; in 1972 Hildegard Knef released a German version called "Wenn das alles ist".

Dorothy Squires recorded the song for her 1977 release Rain Rain Go Away. Bolcom and Morris included a version on their 1978 album Other Songs by Leiber & Stoller. Kate and Mike Westbrook covered it for their 2009 CD allsorts.

In 1970, Diana Ross performed a version of the song at a performance at the Coconut Grove in Los Angeles with altered lyrics. That recording is unreleased, so writers Leiber and Stoller must have blocked it as they did with the following singer, Cristina. The Ross version, however, can now be played and heard, on YouTube.  Another version with altered lyrics, by No wave singer Cristina, was available briefly in 1980. However, it offended songwriters Leiber and Stoller, who sued and were able to get it suppressed for some time. Produced by August Darnell (Kid Creole), this version was eventually re-issued in 2004, with the songwriters' blessing, as a bonus track on a Cristina compilation album, and as a single on the ZE and Island labels, in 1980.

Bette Midler included both audio and video versions on her 2005 DualDisc Bette Midler Sings the Peggy Lee Songbook.

Elizabeth Gillies, best known for playing the role of Jade West on Victorious, released a cover video on 30 March 2014.

Uses in media
 
Peggy Lee did a skit with Carol Burnett on The Carol Burnett Show in the early 1970s, featuring a duet performance of the song that ends with Carol taking a fall.

In The Simpsons episode “Children of a Lesser Clod” Rod and Todd Flanders ask Homer to “sing that crazy song we love”, and Homer obliges with a few bars of Is That All There is?.

The Peggy Lee record appears in Martin Scorsese's 1985 film After Hours. When Paul Hackett (Griffin Dunne) returns to Club Berlin, he uses his last remaining quarter to play the song and asks June (Verna Bloom) to dance.

It was used as the closing theme of the WJW-TV show Big Chuck and Lil' John during the 1980s.

It appears in Chris Petit's 1984 Berlin-based film, Chinese Boxes.

In 1992, film director Lindsay Anderson scattered the ashes of British actresses Rachel Roberts and her friend Jill Bennett, both of whom took their own lives, on the River Thames in London during a boat trip. The "ceremony," as Anderson called the ashes-scattering, is the closing segment in his final film, an autobiographical BBC documentary titled "Is That All There Is?"(1993). As friends and colleagues of the actresses raise their glasses in a toast to "Jill and Rachel" and toss flowers into the Thames, musician Alan Price, accompanying himself on the keyboard, sings "Is That All There Is?"  The song continues as a voice over in the closing credits.

The John Parish and P.J. Harvey version appears on the soundtrack of the 1996 film Basquiat.

This song was performed by Nathan Lane and Dianne Reeves in "I Love A Charade," season 5, episode 74 (2002) of the American television series Sex and the City.
 
Actress Hope Davis performs the song in the 2007 movie The Nines.

The song is frequently referenced in philosopher Charles Taylor's 2007 work, A Secular Age.

The song is featured in the ending credits of the second episode of British documentary film director Adam Curtis’s 2007 documentary series The Trap.

Immersive theater production Sleep No More features both the Peggy Lee and Tony Bennett versions of the song, lip-synced simultaneously by characters in different rooms.

Lee's recording is also featured in the opening sequence and the last scene continuing over the closing titles of the TV series Mad Men, season 7, episode 8, "Severance".

The Peggy Lee rendition is featured in Harmony Korine's 2019 film The Beach Bum.

The song is used in the final scene of the season finale of Heathers.

See also
List of number-one adult contemporary singles of 1969 (U.S.)

References

1968 songs
1969 singles
Peggy Lee songs
Alan Price songs
Songs written by Jerry Leiber and Mike Stoller
Capitol Records singles
Grammy Hall of Fame Award recipients
Grammy Award for Best Female Pop Vocal Performance